Chosin may refer to:
USS Chosin (CG-65), a cruiser of the United States Navy
Battle of Chosin Reservoir, a battle of the 1950–3 Korean War
Lake Changjin also calle Lake Chosin, an artificial lake in Changjin County, South Hamgyong Province, North Korea